Timyra orthadia is a moth in the family Lecithoceridae. It was described by Edward Meyrick in 1906. It is found in Sri Lanka.

The wingspan is 16–18 mm. The forewings are whitish ochreous with a narrow dark fuscous basal fascia and two broad rather dark fuscous fasciae at about one-third and two-thirds, the first somewhat narrowed towards the costa, the second rather oblique, more or less constricted in the disc, beneath dilated and confluent posteriorly with a broad dark fuscous suffusion or sprinkling in the disc. Between these fasciae is a very undefined oblique median line of dark fuscous sprinkles and there is a dark fuscous terminal streak, thickened at the apex. The hindwings are fuscous, in males with a broad median longitudinal ochreous-yellow band, including a deep central groove, and a subdorsal groove enclosing an ochreous-yellow hair-pencil from the base.

References

Moths described in 1906
Timyra
Taxa named by Edward Meyrick